USS Fulton was a steamer that served the U.S. Navy prior to the American Civil War, and was recommissioned in time to see service in that war. However, her participation was limited to being captured by Confederate forces in the port of Pensacola, Florida, at the outbreak of war.

The second ship to be named Fulton by the Navy, a side wheel steamer, her build commenced in 1835, and she was launched 18 May 1837 by Brooklyn Navy Yard; and commissioned 13 December 1837, Captain M. C. Perry in command. She was often called Fulton II. Fulton I was the renamed floating battery Demologos.

Service in the North Atlantic 

Fulton cruised the Atlantic coast, aiding ships in distress, conducting ordnance experiments, and training officers in gunnery. A major event of her early service came on 23 November 1838, when she bested the British steamer  in a speed contest off New York.

In 1841, Captain John T. Newton was in command of Fulton. Experiments in gunnery and projectiles were conducted aboard under the direction of Captain M. C. Perry; during one such experiment, a gun burst, killing several men and wounding others. Newton had been aboard with Commodore Isaac Chauncey, who was inspecting the ship, and the two had left "only 10 or 15 minutes before the explosion".

Decommissioned at New York 23 November 1842, Fulton lay in ordinary until 1851, when she was rebuilt and her machinery completely replaced.

1851 rebuild

The third Fulton rebuild commenced in 1850, was launched on 30 August 1851, at the Brooklyn Navy Yard. Fulton was essentially a harbor defense ship and was unsuitable for the cruising missions then emphasized by Navy policy. Accordingly, the New York Navy Yard rebuilt her in 1851 as a much more conventional warship. Fulton was recommissioned 25 January 1852 for duty in the Home Squadron, and sailed from New York 22 February for the West Indies. After the rebuild she was commonly referred to as Fulton III.

The next year Fultons commanding officer obtained the release of five American merchant ships held at Tampico, Mexico, by revolutionary forces.
 
From October 1858 to May 1859 Fulton joined in operations commanded by Commodore W. B. Shubrick during his negotiations to improve relations with Paraguay, sailing the La Plata and the Parana and Paraguay Rivers.
 
After lying out of commission at Norfolk, Virginia, from 7 May 1859 to 30 July 1859, Fulton cruised off Cuba to suppress the slave trade until laid up at Pensacola, Florida, in mid-October 1859.

The Times reported that she had been wrecked on Santa Rosa Island, off Pensacola, Florida.

Civil War capture 
Captured by the Confederates when they took the Pensacola yard on 12 January 1861, Fulton was considered for use in the Confederate States Navy, but was never fitted out. She was destroyed in the evacuation of the yard by the Confederates upon Federal reoccupation 10 May 1862.

References

External links 

 USS Fulton (1837–1861)

 

Ships built in Brooklyn
Steamships of the United States Navy
Ships of the Union Navy
Gunboats of the United States Navy
Vessels captured from the United States Navy
1837 ships
Maritime incidents in September 1859
Shipwrecks of the American Civil War
Shipwrecks of the Florida coast
Ship fires
Maritime incidents in May 1862